Association Sportive Nationale de la Nigelec is a football (soccer) club from Niger based in Niamey. They won the Super Ligue for the first time in the 2021–22 season.

Achievements
Super Ligue: 1
2021–22.

Niger Cup: 1
2013.

Niger Super Cup: 0

CAF competitions record
Last update: 24 February 2023

Notes

 PR: Preliminary round
 1R: First round
 2Q: Second qualifying round
 PO: Play-off round
 GS: Group stage

References

External links
 Team profile – eurosport

Nigelec
Nigelec
Sport in Niamey